Addae Kyenkyehene  is a Ghanaian football midfielder who played for Ghana in the 1978 African Cup of Nations. He also played for Asante Kotoko.

External links

Year of birth missing (living people)
Living people
Ghanaian footballers
Association football midfielders
Asante Kotoko S.C. players
Ghana international footballers
1978 African Cup of Nations players
1984 African Cup of Nations players
Africa Cup of Nations-winning players
Place of birth missing (living people)